Tadim is a Portuguese parish, located in the municipality of Braga.

References

Freguesias of Braga